Carrier Air Wing Sixteen was a carrier air wing of the United States Navy. It was established as Carrier Air Group Sixteen on 1 September 1960. It became Carrier Air Wing Sixteen on 20 December 1963, and was disestablished in 1971. The wing served aboard  from 1962 (as a CVG) to 1968, including the heavy losses of the 1967-68 cruise.

References 

Seaforces.net 
 CVW-16
Military units and formations established in 1963